HIG may refer to:

 H.I.G. Capital, an American investment firm
 Human interface guidelines for software development
 Hezb-e-Islami Gulbuddin, an Afghan political party
 The Hartford, an American investment and insurance company
 Gjøvik University College
 High-Value Interrogation Group, a multi-agency intelligence organization in the United States government
 Hig Hurtenflurst, a character in The Hitchhiker's Guide to the Galaxy
 Highbridge and Burnham railway station, in England
 Highett railway station, in Victoria, Australia
 HLA Informatics Group, a medical research group
 Home Interiors and Gifts, an American direct sales company
 Kamwe language, spoken in Nigeria